Lee Eun-ju (born 10 January 1989) is a South Korean judoka.

She is the bronze medallist of the 2016 Judo Grand Prix Qingdao in the +78 kg category.

References

External links
 

1989 births
Living people
South Korean female judoka
20th-century South Korean women
21st-century South Korean women